

Expeditions, field work, and fossil discoveries

Institutions and organizations

Natural history museums

Scientific organizations

Scientific advances

Paleoanthropology

Paleobotany

Evolutionary biology

Exopaleontology

Extinction research

Micropaleontology

Invertebrate paleozoology

Trace fossils

Vertebrate paleozoology

Newly named Prolacertiformes

Research techniques

Fossil trade

Law and politics

Regulation of fossil collection, transport, or sale

Fossil-related crime

Official symbols

Protected areas

Ethics and practice

Hoaxes

Scandals

Unethical practice

People

Births

Awards and recognition

Deaths
 Gideon Algernon Mantell died.

Historiography and anthropology of paleontology

Pseudoscience

Popular culture

Amusement parks and attractions

Art

Comics

Literature
 Bleak House by Charles Dickens was published. The story told by this novel is unrelated to paleontology, but it does briefly mention a Megalosaurus, which happened to be the first reference made to dinosaurs in fiction.

Philately

References

1850s in paleontology
Paleontology